Epholca is a genus of moths in the family Geometridae. It was described by David Stephen Fletcher in 1979.

Species
 Epholca arenosa (Butler, 1878)

References
 
 

Ourapterygini